Richard James Rich is an American director, producer, and screenwriter. Rich is founder and owner of Crest Animation Productions.
Rich started his career in the mailroom of the Walt Disney Studios in 1972 and would give piano lessons during lunch breaks. He was chosen by John Lounsbery to be an assistant director for Winnie the Pooh and Tigger Too based on his musical expertise. He made his directorial debut on The Fox and the Hound.

After leaving Disney in 1986, Rich established Rich Animation Studios, later renamed RichCrest. He directed The Swan Princess in 1994 which led up to nine sequels since 2012 about fourteen years later since its second sequel.

Besides feature films, Rich has produced direct-to-video series such as Animated Stories from the New Testament, Animated Stories from the Bible, Animated Stories from the Book of Mormon,  Animated Hero Classics, and K10C: Kids' Ten Commandments.
His more recent credits include acting as producer on the computer-animated comedy drama film Alpha and Omega and as the director/producer of its sequels.

Filmography

See also
 Don Bluth

References

External links
 

Living people
American leaders of the Church of Jesus Christ of Latter-day Saints
American film directors
American film producers
American animators
American animated film directors
American animated film producers
Animation screenwriters
Walt Disney Animation Studios people
Latter Day Saints from California
Latter Day Saints from Utah
Year of birth missing (living people)